The Indo-Aryan languages (or sometimes Indic languages) are a branch of the Indo-Iranian languages in the Indo-European language family. As of the early 21st century, they have more than 800 million speakers, primarily concentrated in India, Pakistan, Bangladesh, Nepal, Sri Lanka, and Maldives. Moreover, apart from the Indian subcontinent, large immigrant and expatriate Indo-Aryan–speaking communities live in Northwestern Europe, Western Asia, North America, the Caribbean, Southeast Africa, Polynesia and Australia, along with several million speakers of Romani languages primarily concentrated in Southeastern Europe. There are over 200 known Indo-Aryan languages.

Modern Indo-Aryan languages descend from Old Indo-Aryan languages such as early Vedic Sanskrit, through Middle Indo-Aryan languages (or Prakrits). The largest such languages in terms of first-speakers are Hindi–Urdu, Bengali (242 million), Punjabi (about 120 million), Marathi (112 million), Gujarati (60 million), Rajasthani (58 million), Bhojpuri (51 million), Odia (35 million), Maithili (about 34 million), Sindhi (25 million), Nepali (16 million), Assamese (15 million), Chhattisgarhi (18 million), Sinhala (17 million), and Romani. A 2005 estimate placed the total number of native speakers of the Indo-Aryan languages at nearly 900 million people.

Classification

Theories 

The Indo-Aryan family as a whole is thought to represent a dialect continuum, where languages are often transitional towards neighboring varieties. Because of this, the division into languages vs. dialects is in many cases somewhat arbitrary. The classification of the Indo-Aryan languages is controversial, with many transitional areas that are assigned to different branches depending on classification. There are concerns that a tree model is insufficient for explaining the development of New Indo-Aryan, with some scholars suggesting the wave model.

Subgroups 
Note that the table only lists some modern Indo-Aryan languages.

Anton I. Kogan, in 2016, conducted a lexicostatistical study of the New Indo-Aryan languages based on a 100-word Swadesh list, using techniques developed by the glottochronologist and comparative linguist Sergei Starostin. That grouping system is notable for Kogan's exclusion of Dardic from Indo-Aryan on the basis of his previous studies showing low lexical similarity to Indo-Aryan (43.5%) and negligible difference with similarity to Iranian (39.3%). He also calculated Sinhala–Dhivehi to be the most divergent Indo-Aryan branch. Nevertheless, the modern consensus of Indo-Aryan linguists tends towards the inclusion of Dardic based on morphological and grammatical features.

Inner–Outer hypothesis 

The Inner–Outer hypothesis argues for a core and periphery of Indo-Aryan languages, with Outer Indo-Aryan (generally including Eastern and Southern Indo-Aryan, and sometimes Northwestern Indo-Aryan, Dardic and Pahari) representing an older stratum of Old Indo-Aryan that has been mixed to varying degrees with the newer stratum that is Inner Indo-Aryan. It is a contentious proposal with a long history, with varying degrees of claimed phonological and morphological evidence. Since its proposal by Rudolf Hoernlé in 1880 and refinement by George Grierson it has undergone numerous revisions and a great deal of debate, with the most recent iteration by Franklin Southworth and Claus Peter Zoller based on robust linguistic evidence (particularly an Outer past tense in -l-). Some of the theory's skeptics include Suniti Kumar Chatterji and Colin P. Masica.

Groups 

Dardic 

The Dardic languages (also Dardu or Pisaca) are a group of Indo-Aryan languages largely spoken in the northwestern extremities of the Indian subcontinent. Dardic was first formulated by George Abraham Grierson in his Linguistic Survey of India but he did not consider it to be a subfamily of Indo-Aryan. The Dardic group as a genetic grouping (rather than areal) has been scrutinised and questioned to a degree by recent scholarship: Southworth, for example, says "the viability of Dardic as a genuine subgroup of Indo-Aryan is doubtful" and "the similarities among [Dardic languages] may result from subsequent convergence".

The Dardic languages are thought to be transitional with Punjabi and Pahari (e.g. Zoller describes Kashmiri as "an interlink between Dardic and West Pahāṛī"), as well as non-Indo-Aryan Nuristani; and are renowned for their relatively conservative features in the context of Proto-Indo-Aryan.

 Kashmiri: Kashmiri, Kishtwari, Poguli;
 Shina: Brokskad, Kundal Shahi, Shina, Ushojo, Kalkoti, Palula, Savi;
 Chitrali: Kalasha, Khowar;
 Kohistani: Bateri, Chilisso, Gowro, Indus Kohistani, Kalami, Tirahi, Torwali, Wotapuri-Katarqalai;
 Pashayi
 Kunar: Dameli, Gawar-Bati, Nangalami, Shumashti.

Northern Zone 

The Northern Indo-Aryan languages, also known as the Pahari ('hill') languages, are spoken throughout the Himalayan regions of the subcontinent.

 Eastern Pahari: Nepali, Jumli, Doteli;
 Central Pahari: Garhwali, Kumaoni;
 Western Pahari (Himachali): Dogri, Kangri, Bhadarwahi, Churahi, Bhateali, Bilaspuri, Chambeali, Gaddi, Pangwali, Mandeali, Mahasu Pahari, Jaunsari, Kullui, Pahari Kinnauri, Hinduri, Sarazi, Sirmauri.

Northwestern Zone 
Northwestern Indo-Aryan languages are spoken in the northwestern region of India and Eastern Pakistan. These languages have been heavily influenced by the middle eastern languages, Arabic and Persian (mostly Persian), dating back to the Conquest of Sind in the 8th century. Punjabi is spoken predominantly in the Punjab region and is the official language of the northern Indian state of Punjab; in addition to being the most widely-spoken language in Pakistan. To the south, Sindhi and its variants are spoken; primarily in Sindh. Northwestern languages are ultimately thought to be descended from Shauraseni Prakrit.

 Punjabi
 Eastern Punjabi: Punjabi, Doabi, Majhi, Malwai, Puadhi, Sansi;
 Western Punjabi (Lahnda): Saraiki, Hindko, Pahari-Pothwari, Inku†;
 Sindhi: Sindhi, Jadgali, Kutchi, Luwati, Memoni, Khetrani, Kholosi.

Western Zone 
Western Indo-Aryan languages, are spoken in the central and western areas within India, such as Madhya Pradesh and Rajasthan, in addition to contiguous regions in Pakistan. Gujarati is the official language of Gujarat, and is spoken by over 50 million people. In Europe, various Romani languages are spoken by the Romani people, an itinerant community who historically migrated from India. The Western Indo-Aryan languages are thought to have diverged from their northwestern counterparts, although they have a common antecedent in Shauraseni Prakrit.

Rajasthani: Standard Rajasthani, Bagri, Marwari, Mewati, Dhundari, Harauti, Mewari, Shekhawati, Dhatki, Malvi, Nimadi, Gujari, Goaria, Loarki, Bhoyari, Kanjari, Od;

 Gujarati: Gujarati, Jandavra, Saurashtra, Aer, Vaghri, Parkari Koli, Kachi Koli, Wadiyara Koli;
 Bhil: Kalto, Vasavi, Wagdi, Gamit, Vaagri Booli;
 Northern Bhil: Bauria, Bhilori, Magari;
 Central Bhil: Bhili proper, Bhilali, Chodri, Dhodia, Dhanki, Dubli;
 Bareli: Palya Bareli, Pauri Bareli, Rathwi Bareli, Pardhi;
 Khandeshi
 Lambadi
 Domaaki
 Domari
 Romani: Carpathian Romani, Balkan Romani, Vlax Romani; 
 Northern Romani: Sinte Romani, Finnish Kalo, Baltic Romani.

Central Zone (Madhya or Hindi) 

Within India, Hindi languages are spoken primarily in the Hindi belt regions and Gangetic plains, including Delhi and the surrounding areas; where they are often transitional with neighbouring lects. Many of these languages, including Braj and Awadhi, have rich literary and poetic traditions. Urdu, a Persianized derivative of Khariboli, is the official language of Pakistan and also has strong historical connections to India, where it also has been designated with official status. Hindi, a standardized and Sanskritized register of Khariboli, is the official language of the Government of India. Together with Urdu, it is the third most-spoken language in the world.

 Western Hindi: Hindustani (including Standard Hindi and Standard Urdu), Khariboli, Braj, Haryanvi, Bundeli, Kannauji, Parya;
 Eastern Hindi: Bagheli, Chhattisgarhi, Surgujia;
 Awadhi: Fiji Hindi, Caribbean Hindustani

Eastern Zone 

The Eastern Indo-Aryan languages, also known as Magadhan languages, are spoken throughout the eastern subcontinent, including Odisha and Bihar, alongside other regions surrounding the northwestern Himalayan corridor. Bengali is the seventh most-spoken language in the world, and has a strong literary tradition; the national anthems of India and Bangladesh are written in Bengali. Assamese and Odia are the official languages of Assam and Odisha, respectively. The Eastern Indo-Aryan languages descend from Magadhan Apabhraṃśa and ultimately from Magadhi Prakrit.

 Bihari:
 Bhojpuri, Caribbean Hindustani, Fiji Hindi;
 Magahi, Khortha;
 Maithili, Angika, Bajjika, Thethi, Dehati;
 Sadanic: Nagpuri (Sadri), Kurmali (Panchpargania);
 Tharu, Kochila Tharu, Buksa, Majhi, Musasa;
 Kumhali, Kuswaric: Danwar, Bote-Darai; 
 Halbic: Halbi, Kamar, Bhunjia, Nahari;
 Odia: Baleswari, Kataki, Ganjami, Sundargadi, Sambalpuri, Desia;
 Bodo Parja, Bhatri, Reli, Kupia;
 Bengali–Assamese: Bishnupriya Manipuri, Hajong, Chittagonian, Chakma, Tanchangya, Rohingya, Sylheti,;
 Bengali-Gauda: Bengali, Bangali, Rarhi, Varendri, Sundarbani, Noakhailla, Manbhumi, Dhakaiya Kutti, Dobhashi;
 Kamarupic: Assamese, Kamrupi, Goalpariya, Rangpuri, Surjapuri, Rajbanshi;

Southern Zone 
Marathi-Konkani languages are ultimately descended from Maharashtri Prakrit, whereas Insular Indo-Aryan languages are descended from Elu Prakrit and possess several characteristics that markedly distinguish them from most of their mainland Indo-Aryan counterparts.

 Marathi-Konkani
 Marathic: Marathi, Varhadi, Andh, Agri, Zadi Boli, Thanjavur, Berar-Deccan Marathi, Phudagi, Judeo, Katkari, Varli, Kadodi;
 Konkanic: Konkani, Canarese Konkani, Maharashtrian Konkani.

Insular Indic 
Insular Indic languages (of Sri Lanka and Maldives) started developing independently and diverging from the continental Indo-Aryan languages from around 5th century BCE.

 Insular Indo-Aryan
 Sinhala
 Maldivian: Dhivehi, Mahl

Unclassified 
The following languages are otherwise unclassified within Indo-Aryan:

 Chinali–Lahul Lohar: Chinali, Lahul Lohar.
 Badeshi

History

Proto-Indo-Aryan 

Proto-Indo-Aryan (or sometimes Proto-Indic) is the reconstructed proto-language of the Indo-Aryan languages. It is intended to reconstruct the language of the pre-Vedic Indo-Aryans. Proto-Indo-Aryan is meant to be the predecessor of Old Indo-Aryan (1500–300 BCE), which is directly attested as Vedic and Mitanni-Aryan. Despite the great archaicity of Vedic, however, the other Indo-Aryan languages preserve a small number of conservative features lost in Vedic.

Mitanni-Aryan hypothesis 

Some theonyms, proper names, and other terminology of the Late Bronze Age Mitanni civilization of Upper Mesopotamia exhibit an Indo-Aryan superstrate. While what few written records left by the Mittani are either in Hurrian (which appears to have been the predominant language of their kingdom) or Akkadian (the main diplomatic language of the Late Bronze Age Near East), these apparently Indo-Aryan names suggest that an Indo-Aryan elite imposed itself over the Hurrians in the course of the Indo-Aryan expansion. If these traces are Indo-Aryan, they would be the earliest known direct evidence of Indo-Aryan, and would increase the precision in dating the split between the Indo-Aryan and Iranian languages (as the texts in which the apparent Indicisms occur can be dated with some accuracy).

In a treaty between the Hittites and the Mitanni, the deities Mitra, Varuna, Indra, and the Ashvins (Nasatya) are invoked. Kikkuli's horse training text includes technical terms such as aika (cf. Sanskrit eka, "one"), tera (tri, "three"), panza (pancha, "five"), satta (sapta, seven), na (nava, "nine"), vartana (vartana, "turn", round in the horse race). The numeral aika "one" is of particular importance because it places the superstrate in the vicinity of Indo-Aryan proper as opposed to Indo-Iranian in general or early Iranian (which has aiva). Their chief festival was the celebration of the solstice (vishuva) which was common in most cultures in the ancient world. The Mitanni warriors were called marya, the term for "warrior" in Sanskrit as well; note mišta-nnu (= miẓḍha, ≈ Sanskrit mīḍha) "payment (for catching a fugitive)" (M. Mayrhofer, Etymologisches Wörterbuch des Altindoarischen, Heidelberg, 1986–2000; Vol. II:358).

Sanskritic interpretations of Mitanni royal names render Artashumara (artaššumara) as Ṛtasmara "who thinks of Ṛta" (Mayrhofer II 780), Biridashva (biridašṷa, biriiašṷa) as Prītāśva "whose horse is dear" (Mayrhofer II 182), Priyamazda (priiamazda) as Priyamedha "whose wisdom is dear" (Mayrhofer II 189, II378), Citrarata as Citraratha "whose chariot is shining" (Mayrhofer I 553), Indaruda/Endaruta as Indrota "helped by Indra" (Mayrhofer I 134), Shativaza (šattiṷaza) as Sātivāja "winning the race price" (Mayrhofer II 540, 696), Šubandhu as Subandhu "having good relatives" (a name in Palestine, Mayrhofer II 209, 735), Tushratta (tṷišeratta, tušratta, etc.) as *tṷaiašaratha, Vedic Tvastar "whose chariot is vehement" (Mayrhofer, Etym. Wb., I 686, I 736).

Indian subcontinent 

Dates indicate only a rough time frame.
 Proto-Indo-Aryan (before 1500 BCE, reconstructed)
 Old Indo-Aryan (ca. 1500–300 BCE)
 early Old Indo-Aryan: includes Vedic Sanskrit (ca. 1500 to 500 BCE)
 late Old Indo-Aryan: Epic Sanskrit, Classical Sanskrit (ca. 200 CE to 1300 CE)
 Mitanni Indo-Aryan (ca. 1400 BCE)
 Middle Indo-Aryan or Prakrits (ca. 300 BCE to 1500 CE) 
 early Buddhist texts (ca. 6th or 5th century BCE)
 early Middle Indo-Aryan: e.g. Ashokan Prakrits, Pali, Gandhari, (ca. 300 BCE to 200 BCE)
 middle Middle Indo-Aryan: e.g. Dramatic Prakrits, Elu (ca. 200 BCE to 700 CE)
 late Middle Indo-Aryan: e.g. Abahattha (ca. 700 CE to 1500 CE)
 Early Modern Indo-Aryan (Late Medieval India): e.g. early Dakhini and emergence of the Dehlavi dialect

Old Indo-Aryan 
The earliest evidence of the group is from Vedic Sanskrit, that is used in the ancient preserved texts of the Indian subcontinent, the foundational canon of the Hindu synthesis known as the Vedas. The Indo-Aryan superstrate in Mitanni is of similar age to the language of the Rigveda, but the only evidence of it is a few proper names and specialized loanwords.

While Old Indo-Aryan is the earliest stage of the Indo-Aryan branch, from which all known languages of the later stages Middle and New Indo-Aryan are derived, some documented Middle Indo-Aryan variants cannot fully be derived from the documented form of Old Indo-Aryan (on which Vedic and Classical Sanskrit are based), but betray features that must go back to other undocumented variants/dialects of Old Indo-Aryan.

From Vedic Sanskrit, "Sanskrit" (literally "put together", "perfected" or "elaborated") developed as the prestige language of culture, science and religion, as well as the court, theatre, etc. Sanskrit of the later Vedic texts is comparable to Classical Sanskrit, but is largely mutually unintelligible with Vedic Sanskrit.

Middle Indo-Aryan (Prakrits) 
Outside the learned sphere of Sanskrit, vernacular dialects (Prakrits) continued to evolve. The oldest attested Prakrits are the Buddhist and Jain canonical languages Pali and Ardhamagadhi Prakrit, respectively. Inscriptions in Ashokan Prakrit were also part of this early Middle Indo-Aryan stage.

By medieval times, the Prakrits had diversified into various Middle Indo-Aryan languages. Apabhraṃśa is the conventional cover term for transitional dialects connecting late Middle Indo-Aryan with early Modern Indo-Aryan, spanning roughly the 6th to 13th centuries. Some of these dialects showed considerable literary production; the Śravakacāra of Devasena (dated to the 930s) is now considered to be the first Hindi book.

The next major milestone occurred with the Muslim conquests in the Indian subcontinent in the 13th–16th centuries. Under the flourishing Turco-Mongol Mughal Empire, Persian became very influential as the language of prestige of the Islamic courts due to adoption of the foreign language by the Mughal emperors.

The two largest languages that formed from Apabhraṃśa were Bengali and Hindustani; others include Assamese, Sindhi, Gujarati, Odia, Marathi, and Punjabi.

New Indo-Aryan

Medieval Hindustani 

In the Central Zone Hindi-speaking areas, for a long time the prestige dialect was Braj Bhasha, but this was replaced in the 19th century by Dehlavi-based Hindustani. Hindustani was strongly influenced by Persian, with these and later Sanskrit influence leading to the emergence of Modern Standard Hindi and Modern Standard Urdu as registers of the Hindustani language. This state of affairs continued until the division of the British Indian Empire in 1947, when Hindi became the official language in India and Urdu became official in Pakistan. Despite the different script the fundamental grammar remains identical, the difference is more sociolinguistic than purely linguistic. Today it is widely understood/spoken as a second or third language throughout South Asia and one of the most widely known languages in the world in terms of number of speakers.

Outside the Indian subcontinent

Domari 

Domari is an Indo-Aryan language spoken by older Dom people scattered across the Middle East. The language is reported to be spoken as far north as Azerbaijan and as far south as central Sudan. Based on the systematicity of sound changes, linguists have concluded that the ethnonyms Domari and Romani derive from the Indo-Aryan word ḍom.

Lomavren 

Lomavren is a nearly extinct mixed language, spoken by the Lom people, that arose from language contact between a language related to Romani and Domari and the Armenian language.

Romani 

The Romani language is usually included in the Western Indo-Aryan languages. Romani varieties, which are mainly spoken throughout Europe, are noted for their relatively conservative nature; maintaining the Middle Indo-Aryan present-tense person concord markers, alongside consonantal endings for nominal case. Indeed, these features are no longer evident in most other modern Central Indo-Aryan languages. Moreover, Romani shares an innovative pattern of past-tense person, which corresponds to Dardic languages, such as Kashmiri and Shina. This is believed to be further indication that proto-Romani speakers were originally situated in central regions of the subcontinent, before migrating to northwestern regions. However, there are no known historical sources regarding the development of the Romani language specifically within India.

Research conducted by nineteenth-century scholars Pott (1845) and Miklosich (1882–1888) demonstrated that the Romani language is most aptly designated as a New Indo-Aryan language (NIA), as opposed to Middle Indo-Aryan (MIA); establishing that proto-Romani speakers could not have left India significantly earlier than AD 1000.

The principal argument favouring a migration during or after the transition period to NIA is the loss of the old system of nominal case, coupled with its reduction to a two-way nominative-oblique case system. A secondary argument concerns the system of gender differentiation, due to the fact that Romani has only two genders (masculine and feminine). Middle Indo-Aryan languages (named MIA) generally employed three genders (masculine, feminine and neuter), and some modern Indo-Aryan languages retain this aspect today.

It is suggested that loss of the neuter gender did not occur until the transition to NIA. During this process, most of the neuter nouns became masculine, while several became feminine. For example, the neuter aggi "fire" in Prakrit morphed into the feminine āg in Hindi, and jag in Romani. The parallels in grammatical gender evolution between Romani and other NIA languages have additionally been cited as indications that the forerunner of Romani remained on the Indian subcontinent until a later period, possibly as late as the tenth century.

Sindhic migrations 
Kholosi, Jadgali, and Luwati represent offshoots of the Sindhic subfamily of Indo-Aryan that have established themselves in the Persian gulf region, perhaps through sea-based migrations. These are of a later origin than the Rom and Dom migrations which represent a different part of Indo-Aryan as well.

Indentured labourer migrations 
The use by the British East India Company of indentured labourers led to the transplanting of Indo-Aryan languages around the world, leading to locally influenced lects that diverged from the source language, such as Fiji Hindi and Caribbean Hindustani.

Phonology

Consonants

Stop positions 
The normative system of New Indo-Aryan stops consists of five places of articulation: labial, dental, "retroflex", palatal, and velar, which is the same as that of Sanskrit. The "retroflex" position may involve retroflexion, or curling the tongue to make the contact with the underside of the tip, or merely retraction. The point of contact may be alveolar or postalveolar, and the distinctive quality may arise more from the shaping than from the position of the tongue. Palatals stops have affricated release and are traditionally included as involving a distinctive tongue position (blade in contact with hard palate).

Moving away from the normative system, some languages and dialects have alveolar affricates  instead of palatal, though some among them retain  in certain positions: before front vowels (esp. ), before , or when geminated. Alveolar as an additional point of articulation occurs in Marathi and Konkani where dialect mixture and others factors upset the aforementioned complementation to produce minimal environments, in some West Pahari dialects through internal developments (> ), and in Kashmiri. The addition of a retroflex affricate to this in some Dardic languages maxes out the number of stop positions at seven (barring borrowed ), while a reduction to the inventory involves *ts > , which has happened in Assamese, Chittagonian, Sinhala (though there have been other sources of a secondary ), and Southern Mewari.

Further reductions in the number of stop articulations are in Assamese and Romani, which have lost the characteristic dental/retroflex contrast, and in Chittagonian, which may lose its labial and velar articulations through spirantisation in many positions (> ).
 /q x ɣ f/ are restricted to Perso-Arabic loanwords in most IA languages but they occur natively in Khowar. According to Masica (1991) some dialects of Pashayi have a /θ/ which is unusual for IA languages. Domari which is spoken in the Middle East and had high contact with Middle Eastern languages has /q ħ ʕ ʔ/ and emphatic consonants from loanwords.

Nasals 
Sanskrit was noted as having five nasal-stop articulations corresponding to its oral stops, and among modern languages and dialects Dogri, Kacchi, Kalasha, Rudhari, Shina, Saurashtri, and Sindhi have been analysed as having this full complement of phonemic nasals     , with the last two generally as the result of the loss of the stop from a homorganic nasal + stop cluster ( >  and  > ), though there are other sources as well.

In languages that lack phonemic nasals at some places of articulation, they can still occur allophonically from place assimilation in a nasal + stop culture, e.g. Hindi  > .

Aspiration and breathy-voice 
Most Indo-Aryan languages have contrastive aspiration, and some retain historical breathy voice on voiced consonants. Sometimes both phenomena are analysed as a single aspiration contrast. The places and manners of articulation which allow contrastive aspiration vary by language; e.g. Sindhi permits phonemic , but the phonemic status of this sound in Hindi is uncertain, and many "Dardic" languages lack aspirated retroflex sibilants despite having unaspirated equivalents.

In languages that have lost breathy-voice, the contrast has often been replaced with tone.

Regional developments 

 Implosives: Languages in the Sindhic subfamily, as well as Saraiki, western Marwari dialects, and some dialects of Gujarati have developed implosive consonants from historical intervocalic geminates and word-initial stops. Sindhi has a full implosive series except for the dental implosive: . It has been claimed that Wadiyari Koli has the dental implosive too. Other languages have less complete implosive series, e.g. Kacchi has just .
 Prenasalized stops: Sinhala and Maldivian (Dhivehi) have a series of prenasalized stops covering all places except for palatal: .
 Palatalization: Kashmiri (natively) and some Romani dialects (from contact with Slavic languages) have contrastive palatalisation.
 Voiceless lateral In Gawarbati, some Pashai dialects, partly Bashkarik and some Shina dialects have /ɬ/ from clusters of tr kr or sometimes pr; dr gr and br merged with /l/ in these languages.
 Lateral affricates: Bhadarwahi has an unusual series of lateral retroflex affricates ( derived from historical  clusters.

Vowels 
Vowel typologies are varied across Indo-Aryan due to diachronic mergers and (in some cases) splits, as well as different accounts by linguists for even the widely-spoken languages. Vowel systems per  are listed below. Many languages also have phonemic nasal vowels.

Sylheti language being a tonal, still classified as the Indo-Aryan language. The vowels of Sylheti language listed below.

Charts 
The following are consonant systems of major and representative New Indo-Aryan languages, mostly following , though here they are in IPA. Parentheses indicate those consonants found only in loanwords: square brackets indicate those with "very low functional load". The arrangement is roughly geographical.

Sociolinguistics

Register 
In many Indo-Aryan languages, the literary register is often more archaic and utilises a different lexicon (Sanskrit or Perso-Arabic) than spoken vernacular. One example is Bengali's high literary form, Sādhū bhāśā, as opposed to the more modern Calita bhāśā (Cholito-bhasha). This distinction approaches diglossia.

Language and dialect 
In the context of South Asia, the choice between the appellations "language" and "dialect" is a difficult one, and any distinction made using these terms is obscured by their ambiguity. In one general colloquial sense, a language is a "developed" dialect: one that is standardised, has a written tradition and enjoys social prestige. As there are degrees of development, the boundary between a language and a dialect thus defined is not clear-cut, and there is a large middle ground where assignment is contestable.
There is a second meaning of these terms, in which the distinction is drawn on the basis of linguistic similarity. Though seemingly a "proper" linguistics sense of the terms, it is still problematic: methods that have been proposed for quantifying difference (for example, based on mutual intelligibility) have not been seriously applied in practice; and any relationship established in this framework is relative.

See also 
 Indo-Aryans
 Iranic languages
 Indo-Aryan migration
 Proto-Vedic Continuity
 The family of Brahmic scripts
 Linguistic history of India
 Indo-Aryan loanwords in Tamil
 Languages of Bangladesh
 Languages of India
 Languages of Maldives
 Languages of Nepal
 Languages of Pakistan
 Languages of Sri Lanka
 Languages of South Asia

Notes

References

Further reading 
Morgenstierne, Georg. "Early Iranic Influence upon Indo-Aryan." Acta Iranica, I. série, Commemoration Cyrus. Vol. I. Hommage universel (1974): 271-279.
 John Beames, A comparative grammar of the modern Aryan languages of India: to wit, Hindi, Panjabi, Sindhi, Gujarati, Marathi, Oriya, and Bangali. Londinii: Trübner, 1872–1879. 3 vols.
 .
 Madhav Deshpande (1979). Sociolinguistic attitudes in India: An historical reconstruction. Ann Arbor: Karoma Publishers. ,  (pbk).
 Chakrabarti, Byomkes (1994). A comparative study of Santali and Bengali. Calcutta: K.P. Bagchi & Co. 
 Erdosy, George. (1995). The Indo-Aryans of ancient South Asia: Language, material culture and ethnicity. Berlin: Walter de Gruyter. .
 Ernst Kausen, 2006. Die Klassifikation der indogermanischen Sprachen (Microsoft Word, 133 KB)
 Kobayashi, Masato.; & George Cardona (2004). Historical phonology of old Indo-Aryan consonants. Tokyo: Research Institute for Languages and Cultures of Asia and Africa, Tokyo University of Foreign Studies. .
 .
 Misra, Satya Swarup. (1980). Fresh light on Indo-European classification and chronology. Varanasi: Ashutosh Prakashan Sansthan.
 Misra, Satya Swarup. (1991–1993). The Old-Indo-Aryan, a historical & comparative grammar (Vols. 1–2). Varanasi: Ashutosh Prakashan Sansthan.
 Sen, Sukumar. (1995). Syntactic studies of Indo-Aryan languages. Tokyo: Institute for the Study of Languages and Foreign Cultures of Asia and Africa, Tokyo University of Foreign Studies.
 Vacek, Jaroslav. (1976). The sibilants in Old Indo-Aryan: A contribution to the history of a linguistic area. Prague: Charles University.

External links 
 The Indo-Aryan languages, 25 October 2009
 The Indo-Aryan languages Colin P.Masica 
 Survey of the syntax of the modern Indo-Aryan languages (Rajesh Bhatt), 7 February 2003.

Indo-European languages